The Huron-Superior Catholic District School Board (HSCDSB, known as English-language Separate District School Board No. 31 prior to 1999) is a separate school board for Sault Ste. Marie, Ontario, Canada, and surrounding communities.

Secondary schools

Sault Ste. Marie
 Holy Angels Learning Centre
 St. Basil Secondary, Sault Ste. Marie (closed)
 St. Mary's College, Sault Ste. Marie

Elementary schools

Blind River
 St. Mary's

Chapleau
 Our Lady of Fatima

Elliot Lake
 Our Lady of Fatima
 Our Lady of Lourdes French Immersion

Espanola
 Sacred Heart

Massey
 St. Mary School

Sault Ste. Marie
 Holy Family
 Our Lady of Lourdes
 St. Basil
 Holy Cross
 St. Mary's French Immersion
 St. Paul
 St. Francis French Immersion

Wawa
 St. Joseph

White River
 St. Basil

See also
List of school districts in Ontario
List of high schools in Ontario

References

External links
 Huron-Superior District Catholic District School Board

Roman Catholic school districts in Ontario